Catocala cerogama, the yellow-banded underwing, is a moth of the tribe Catocalini that occurs in North America. The species was first described by Achille Guenée in 1852.

Description
The wingspan is 64 to 81 mm. They have even, deep yellow bands on their hindwings, the forewings are usually brownish gray. Look for a pale band that connects the whitish subreniform a spot to the costa.

Range
As far north as Nova Scotia south to North Carolina, west to Manitoba, South Dakota, and Missouri.

Life cycle
The adults fly between July and October.

Larval foods
 American basswood

References

cerogama
Moths of North America
Moths described in 1852